Koiak ([]), also known as Choiak (Khoiák) and Kiyahk (Kiahk, [];  or ), is the fourth month of the ancient Egyptian and Coptic calendars. It lasts between 10 December and 8 January of the Gregorian calendar, or between 11 December and 9 January of the Gregorian calendar in Coptic calendar years immediately following a Coptic calendar leap year (which occur every four years, in Coptic calendar years immediately preceding those that are divisible by 4 to produce an integer; i.e., 1719, 1723, 1727, 1731, etc. are all examples of leap years in the Coptic calendar). The month of Koiak is also the fourth month of the Season of Akhet (Inundation) in Ancient Egypt, when the Nile floods historically covered the land. They have not done so since the construction of the High Dam at Aswan.

Name
The name of the month of Koiak comes from the Ancient Egyptian phrase k3 ḥr k3 "Soul upon Soul", a name of the sacred ancient Egyptian Apis Bull. It is attested in cuneiform with the pronunciation  ku-i-iḫ-ku, likely representing /kɔʔ-iḥ-kɔʔ/ with an o-vowel as in later Coptic.

Coptic tradition
The month of Koiak holds a special place in the rite of the Coptic Orthodox Church. It is known as the "Mariam Month" ("Month of Mary") because the Nativity according to the Coptic calendar falls on 29 Koiak. The month is characterized by beautiful midnight praises that commemorate the Lord's Incarnation and venerate his mother, the Virgin Mary. The name of the Koiak midnight praise translates into Seven and Four, describing the outline of the praise that consists of 4 Canticles and 7 Theotokia (glorifications of Saint Mary).

It was at the beginning of the month of Koiak in Coptic calendar year 1726 that the Virgin Mary was said to have appeared in churches all over Egypt.

Coptic Synaxarium of the month of Koiak

Rituals 
During the month of Koiak, many rituals and festivals are performed in Egypt to celebrate Osiris, Isis, and Nephthys. These rites have been prominent as early as the New Kingdom. Two women will take the roles of the goddesses, Isis and Nephthys, to mourn for their dead brother Osiris. The main festival was over a length of ten days, ending at the day of Osiris's resurrection. This day also marked the beginning of the new agricultural season, when the Egyptians began to plant new crops for the year. Each day of the festival also featured a scene of purifications, feasts, and constructions of memorials associated with Osiris's resurrection.

See also 
 Egyptian, Coptic, and Islamic calendars

References

Citations

Bibliography
   Synaxarium of the month of Kiahk

Months of the Coptic calendar
Egyptian calendar